Leodigard Martin (born 8 October 1960) is a Tanzanian long-distance runner. He competed in the marathon at the 1980 Summer Olympics.

References

1960 births
Living people
Athletes (track and field) at the 1980 Summer Olympics
Tanzanian male long-distance runners
Tanzanian male marathon runners
Olympic athletes of Tanzania
Place of birth missing (living people)